Cotton Lyndal Hill (September 1, 1927—November 11, 2007) was a fictional character in the Fox animated series King of the Hill voiced by Toby Huss. He was the father of Hank Hill, Good Hank Hill (or "G.H."), Junichiro (his illegitimate half-Japanese son), and, according to him, at least 270 possible others. He was a World War II veteran who had his shins "blowed off by a Japanman's machine gun" in combat and later had his feet attached to his knees as a result. This made him a foot shorter than his relatives and caused a characteristic waddle. According to Hank, Cotton was 6'4" with his shins and was 5'0" without them. Despite his disability, he eventually reached the rank of Colonel in the Texas State Defense Forces and was addressed as such by his friends. Cotton Hill dies in the 12th season of King of the Hill at age 71 after suffering severe burns from slipping on a flat top grill.

Early life and military service
If Cotton's story is to be believed, he was born around 1927, making him about 70 in the first season of the show. In a third-season episode Hank says Cotton is 70, and in the Season 4 episode "Cotton Comes Marching Home", he states himself to be 71. Little is known about Cotton's childhood other than that he started out with a gun at an early age according to Hank in the episode "How to Fire A Rifle Without Really Trying", that he attended Fort Birk when he was very young and spent much of his childhood there as he revealed in "An Officer and A Gentle Boy", that he apparently joined the army when he was only 14 years old as revealed in "Shins of the Father", and that Cotton's mother apparently died giving birth to him, as he exaggerates in "Death Picks Cotton". Almost nothing is known about Cotton's father, except that he may have been German, as Peggy tells Bobby in the episode "Tears of an Inflatable Clown" and the only time Cotton ever himself refers to his father during the entire series is when he shouts at Hank: "You ain't my daddy, I'm your daddy!". Cotton also has an unnamed brother (Dusty's father).

Cotton was zealously proud of his military service record and his status as a war hero, although he tended to exaggerate his exploits.  He often claims to anyone who will listen that he killed "fitty [50] men" during the war.  He consistently reminded everyone within earshot about how he lost his shins during World War II:

"I was 14, just a little older than Bobby. But I knew Uncle Sam needed me, so I lied and signed up. We had beat the Nazzys in Italy, and they shipped me to the Pacific theater. A Tojo torpedo sent our troop ship to the bottom. I could only save three of my buddies: Fatty, Stinky, and Brooklyn. They were kind of like you fellas [to Bill, Dale, and Boomhauer], only one of them was from Brooklyn. Out of the sun came a Tojo Zero and put fitty bullets in my back. The blood attracted sharks.  I had to give 'em Fatty. Then things took a turn for the worse. I made it to an island, but it was full of Tojos! They were spitting on the U.S. flag! So I rushed 'em, but it was a trap.  They opened fire and blew my shins off.  Last thing I remember, I beat 'em all to death with a big piece of Fatty. I woke up in a field hospital, and they were sewing my feet to my knees." 

He refers to the Japanese as "Tojos," a slur not unlike Jap and deriving from war-time Japanese Prime Minister and General Hideki Tojo. He would also refer to the Nazis as "Nazzys".

Based upon Cotton's uniform in the episode "Returning Japanese", he was awarded the following military decorations:  Medal of Honor, Purple Heart, and American Campaign Medal. Cotton left Japan wearing the rank of Private in his own flashback while reminiscing to Hank how he had met Michiko. He was referred to as a colonel repeatedly during the series, reflecting his rank in the Texas State Guard after the war.  In the episode "When Cotton Comes Marching Home", his Silver Star is displayed in a case at the VFW. In the 12th episode of season 11, he is wearing the third class of the Legion of Honor, the highest award given by the French government, who gave it to a select handful of American troops for their service in World War II.

Cotton states in a sixth-season episode that he served with the U.S. Army's 77th Infantry Division.

He has a number of war trophies that can be seen in various episodes, including a Prussian Pickelhaube which he sometimes used to cut Hank's hair in an even bowl cut during Hank's youth, and a Nazi canoe which he claimed was "Hitler's canoe", though given his propensity to exaggerate his war stories, the actual origin of the canoe is uncertain.

The pride he has in his military service often colors his opinions of others; he has often expressed disdain for Hank's lack of service, and enjoys making fun of his son for being excluded due to his narrow urethra.  Cotton also has a tendency to exaggerate his service in the war. For example, in the episode "Cotton's Plot" he stated he killed Nazis ("Nazzys") in Munich on April 30 and Japanese ("Tojos") on May 2 in Okinawa.

He also has expressed dislike for veterans of the Vietnam War, as he blames them to some degree for losing it - though he eventually accords them a measure of respect for trying their best.

Aside from some confirmation from his war buddies, it is unknown if Cotton actually ever served in Europe, considering the 77th served in the Pacific Theater and the majority of his war flashbacks are shown to take place in the Pacific fighting the Japanese. However, documentation obtained by Peggy in Cotton's Plot did back his claim of fighting in the Sardinia campaign, which was mainly an air force campaign rather a battle on the ground.

Solomon Islands:
Cotton was ordered to retake an airfield on the Solomon Islands. His unit was pinned down by a Japanese machine gun nest high up in a hill, so he sneaked into a fifty-five gallon barrel of sake. He held his breath until the Japanese got good and drunk, and then he jumped out and spit it all out into his Zippo (lighter). He "hibachi'd" the whole squad. ("Cotton's Plot")

Guadalcanal:
In the episode "Yankee Hanky", Cotton references that he and Stinky were on Guadalcanal, and it rained for 17 days.

Anzio:
On January 30, 1944, Cotton's unit attacked Anzio. They had "caught the Krauts with their pants down and their schnitzel exposed." They had taken the beach by noon, and the town by nightfall.

Normandy:
Cotton said that he climbed the cliffs of Normandy with a fifty-pound ice cream maker on his back. ("Cotton's Plot")

Saipan:
Cotton said that he led a platoon of men through the jungles of Sai Pan. ("When Cotton Comes Marching Home")

Guam:
In 1944, in Guam, Cotton crawled through a minefield to retrieve General MacArthur's corn cob pipe. ("Cotton's Plot")

Philippines:
Cotton said that he served in the Philippines. ("Unfortunate Son")

Iwo Jima:
Cotton spent two weeks under a pile of bodies on Iwo Jima. ("Revenge of the Lutefisk") He and Topsy show a bayonet technique Topsy used to gut a kamikaze. ("Unfortunate Son")

Munich:
Cotton claimed to have fought in Munich on April 30, 1945, and probably longer, but later realized he didn't. ("Cotton's Plot")

Okinawa:
On May 2, 1945, on Okinawa, Cotton invented a bayonet technique that is still used by the army today. ("Cotton's Plot")

P.O.W. Camp:
Cotton was captured at an unknown time by the Japanese, and put in a bamboo rat cage. He had to eat rats, but let the last one live so he could eat its droppings. He called it "Jungle Rice", and said it "tasted fine". By September, he was skinny enough to slip through the bars, and strangled the guard with a string made of braided rat tails, and ran to safety. ("Cotton's Plot") He had also learned to stop his heartbeat, so the Japanese would stop torturing him for a moment, probably at the P.O.W. camp ("Death Picks Cotton"), and claimed that he only cried when the Japanese tore off his fingernails. ("Returning Japanese")

Miscellaneous:
Cotton severed the windpipe of a German corporal with a two-foot strand of dental floss he kept in his boot. ("The Final Shinsuit") He survived on a life raft by trapping rain water in his upturned eyelid. ("Cotton's Plot")

Relationships
Before leaving Japan, Cotton had an affair with a Japanese nurse, Michiko, which resulted in the birth of his eldest son (and Hank's older half-brother), Junichiro (voiced by David Carradine); he left suddenly despite trying to stay, and knew nothing of his child until years later (a flashback clip shows him being clubbed and dragged onto the troopship leaving Japan). Michiko is one of the few women he treats respectfully at any time and the only woman he treats respectfully all the time.

After the war, Cotton supervised the installation of asbestos in eleven bowling alleys and every public school in Heimlich County.  Cotton eventually traveled back to Japan to reconcile with his long-lost lover, and soon learned of his illegitimate son.  Junichiro initially rejected Cotton's attempt to make peace, and formally renounced his Hill family heritage.  This enraged Cotton, who re-declared war on Japan and planned to spit in the face of Emperor Akihito out of spite. ("Returning Japanese") When Cotton saw that Hank and Junichiro had mended fences and even become friends, and Junichiro said that he was not ashamed to be a Hill any more, Cotton ditched his plan and accepted the Emperor's kind words. He also made peace with Junichiro's mother, who tore a picture taken of them as young adults after World War II in half—and gave the half with her picture to Cotton, while keeping his picture for herself.

Cotton claimed he divorced from Hank's mother, Tilly, because he "outgrew" her after she lost her large rear end, though it had been stated earlier in the show - such as in the season 1 episode "Shins of a Father" - that Tilly divorced him after years of verbal abuse. His second wife was a hospital volunteer, Deirdre "Didi" Hill, who is implied to be the same age as Hank as Hank claims that the two went to kindergarten together (according to episode 1-08, "Shins of the Father"). At age 71, Cotton fathered a third son from his second wife Didi, whom he named Good-Hank "G.H." Hill to differentiate from, and possibly spite, Hank (who was temporarily called "B.H. - Bad Hank").

Cotton's relationship with Hank was strained; while Hank seemed to have a deep reverence (and fear) of his father, he stood up to Cotton on several occasions. Cotton also became depressed (and enraged) by the fact that he and Hank did not have a good relationship, once going homicidally insane when Hank said that he hates him. In spite of all this, however, Cotton never hesitated to refer to Hank as "My Boy," and on several occasions tried to help him (such as when Kahn and Minh were befouling his house). Throughout the series, Cotton has also shown several times that he may actually care for Hank, such as calling him a good son in "Returning Japanese", saving him from being shot in the episode "Yankee Hankee", and leaving and trusting Hank with his last requests and personal possessions in "Serving Me Right for giving George S. Patton the Bathroom Key". It is likely Cotton treats Hank horribly simply because he hates various aspects of Hank's life, such as his job as a propane salesman, his place of birth (New York), his personality, how he chooses to raise Bobby, his marriage to Peggy, how he is different from his cousin Dusty, how Hank thwarted his plan to assassinate Fidel Castro (Tilly had gone into labor just as Cotton was about to kill the communist leader), and - most importantly - how Hank did not follow in his father's footsteps and become a war hero.

Cotton had an antagonistic relationship with Peggy, whom he addressed as "Hank's wife" among other epithets. On rare occasions though, Cotton evinced a grudging respect for Peggy, as in "To Spank With Love" and "Cotton's Plot."

Cotton appears to have a good relationship with Bobby. He once conceded that Hank was a better father than himself, stating, "You made Bobby. All I made was you." Cotton shows that he is proud of Bobby and supports him. Once contemplating suicide, Cotton confides in Bobby and gives him a letter of recommendation for the army, irking Hank. Cotton often tries to pass on his misogynistic views to Bobby, even going so far as to try to buy him a hooker once, although Hank and Peggy are always able to reverse the damage. Cotton demonstrates his affection for Bobby in numerous instances. In "How to Fire a Rifle Without Really Trying", he comes to watch Bobby and Hank shoot in a father-son shooting competition, stating, "I'm always here to support my Bobby." In "Revenge of the Lutefisk", Cotton even goes so far as to take the blame for Bobby after Bobby confesses he was the one who burned down the church (Claiming "I'm an old man, everyone already hates me!" whereas Bobby is just a child and has his whole life ahead of him.) and Didi reveals to Bobby that Cotton told her that if their unborn child turned out as good as Bobby, he wouldn't abandon it. Reflecting on Cotton's relationship with his grandson in "Death Picks Cotton," Hank states, "Even though he hates most things, he does love Bobby." It could be inferred that his love for Bobby is mixed also with a deep pride and respect for him, viewing him as actually tougher than Hank. Although Cotton respects Bobby more than anyone in the family, on his deathbed in "Death Picks Cotton", Cotton claims he does not love anyone, though this could be him just trying to sound tough.

Personality
Cotton is a consistently misogynistic, chauvinistic, violent, abusive, and intolerant character. He talks down to women, berates his son, is prone to violent outbursts, and on more than one occasion has exhibited homicidal tendencies. His abrasive manner is consistently embarrassing for Hank and usually infuriating for Hank's wife, Peggy. Throughout his history on the series, Cotton never once addressed Peggy by name, but he instead called her "Hank's wife", which was used as a running gag, including on the very rare occasion he's trying to be nice to her (the only other names Cotton had ever addressed Peggy by was "Hillary" in the episode "Shins of the Father", as well as Manimal and Sasquatch; Peggy also didn't seem to care being called "Hank's Wife" beyond visible annoyance, and never once told Cotton not to call her that). He even attempts to pass on some of his sexist traits to Bobby at one point, teaching him that women should be made to cook and clean for their husbands all day long.

On rare occasions, Cotton shows a vulnerable side that he normally keeps hidden: he realizes that he was a terrible father and person, hates himself for growing old and becoming disabled, and readily admits that he would die to protect his grandson, Bobby ("Revenge of the Lutefisk"). He also appears to not be bigoted towards black people or Jews, as he is shown interacting with both groups and acting more well-mannered than he usually is (when he finds out his ex-wife's new boyfriend Gary is Jewish, he wishes him a Happy Hanukkah and says that one of his war buddies was also Jewish; presumably this is the "Brooklyn" man Cotton mentioned as having sacrificed himself during a shark attack so Cotton and others could escape alive, albeit horribly injured). When some annoying liberal roommates of Luanne's reflexively insult him by calling him a Nazi, Cotton and his buddy Topsy get visibly angry and attack the roommates, scaring them into leaving the area and giving Luanne back her home.

Cotton also demonstrates a rough, demanding, and often abusive, but at times inspirational leadership. He admits to Hank that he always wanted to win in battle but accepted defeat when his men did their best. Through tough love and intense physical therapy, Cotton also helped Peggy walk again after a debilitating skydiving accident crippled her. Hank was initially wary of this, because he feared that Cotton was simply taking advantage of Peggy's brief disability in order to humiliate her.

It was never revealed throughout the series how Cotton became such a nasty and rude character, or if he ever was a different person. Cotton has also shown in multiple episodes that he suffers from mild to severe post traumatic stress disorder (PTSD) ("Returning Japanese" & "Death Picks Cotton"), which can explain the majority of his "violent outbursts". Whatever the reason is, Cotton never sought forgiveness for how he treated Hank, Peggy, Tilly, and many others throughout the series. In the episode "Hank gets Dusted" Hank says straight up to his cousin Dusty that Cotton is in fact a jack-ass.

Death
In the season 12 episode "Death Picks Cotton," Cotton suffers severe injuries while at a Japanese restaurant in Arlen. Climbing onto a grill table, he chokes on a piece of shrimp (to which he is extremely allergic), then slips and falls on the hot surface. He is taken to the hospital and diagnosed with a hip fracture, severe burns on his arms, torn ligaments in his ankle/knee joints, and an infection of his esophagus due to swallowing the shrimp. X-rays reveal that he has four rusty bullets lodged in his back and one in his heart from old war wounds. In spite of his injuries and a heart attack suffered while in the hospital, Cotton survives long enough to torment both Hank and Peggy, even slowing his heartbeat down to feign death (a trick he learned while confined to a Japanese POW camp).

The last person to see him alive is Peggy, who tells him that despite Cotton's constant torture of his son, Hank has always loved him and that she hopes he will live forever in the friendless, spiteful existence he has made for himself as the unhappy, unpleasant person he is. Cotton replies "Oh, do ya, now?," laughs, and then dies. Peggy does not tell Hank of this exchange; instead, she lies that Cotton's last words were kind ones meant for Hank. In the final scene of the episode, Dale Gribble fulfills a request from Cotton to blow up a storage shed Hank has built. Hank initially plans to honor a separate wish, to have Cotton's head detached from his body and sent to the Emperor of Japan, but Peggy stops him by (falsely) claiming that Cotton withdrew the request just before his death. Neither Didi nor G.H. appear in "Death Picks Cotton," nor is his funeral shown. He was to have been buried at the Texas State Cemetery, a grave which he earned in recognition of his military service, as explained by the episode "Cotton's Plot", although he ended up being cremated instead.

In the season 13 episode "Serves Me Right for Giving General George S. Patton the Bathroom Key," Hank receives from Didi a box containing Cotton's personal possessions and a list of embarrassing last requests. Cotton also left Hank a rude message on his tape recorder telling Hank that he wanted all the embarrassing requests completed by him. Peggy did not want Hank to fulfill Cotton's wishes, but Hank said that fulfilling Cotton's last requests was the best gift he had ever received from his father. Hank completed every single one of the humiliating requests, which Hank felt was Cotton's way of humiliating Hank one last time. The last request Cotton left was to have his cremated remains flushed down a bar toilet that General George S. Patton once used; such practice was also a tradition in Cotton's platoon, and all of Cotton's deceased war buddies were also flushed down the toilet. Hank and his friends respectively honored the request and flushed Cotton's remains down the toilet, resulting in the toilet being plugged and the bar owner demanding Hank pay for the damage. As a result of this, Peggy claims at the end of the episode that even though Cotton is dead, he will always find a way to disrupt their lives.

Fox published the following obituary for Cotton:

Cotton Hill, age 84, World War II veteran, died Sunday in a Texas VA hospital. Hill suffered from several injuries ranging from four rusty bullets lodged in his back (one in his heart) from his military service, a broken hip and torn ligaments in his ankle-knees, to an infection in his esophagus and severe burns caused by a freak shrimp accident that occurred earlier this week at Tokyaki's Japanese restaurant. Hill leaves behind sons Hank Hill and G.H. (short for "Good Hank"); daughter-in-law Peggy Hill; grandson Bobby Hill; ex-wife Tilly; second wife Didi; first love and former Japanese lover Michiko; an illegitimate Japanese son, Junichiro; and nephew Dusty Hill (of band ZZ Top).

References

External links
 

King of the Hill characters
Television characters introduced in 1997
Animated characters introduced in 1997
Fictional World War II veterans
Fictional amputees
Fictional characters with post-traumatic stress disorder
Fictional colonels
Fictional Medal of Honor recipients
Fictional characters from Texas
Male characters in animated series
Fictional child abusers